Rick Fraser may refer to:

 Rick Fraser (chuckwagon racer) (born 1959), Canadian chuckwagon racer
 Rick Fraser (ice hockey) (born 1954), Canadian ice hockey player
 Rick Fraser (politician) (born 1971/72), Canadian politician